Emanuele Berry is an American writer, radio producer and journalist. She is the Executive Editor at This American Life and  previously worked as a producer and editor at Gimlet Media.

Career 
Berry joined This American Life in 2019 as a producer and editor where she reported and co-produced episodes, including the 2020 protests in Hong Kong. She was promoted to the role of Executive Editor - a role she has held since October 2020
. 
Berry is considered the only staff member till date to have broken reality TV news in her reporting for the show.
In March 2021, She provided editorial assistance to The Improvement Association podcast at the New York Times
. Berry has also been named as one of the guest lecturers for the new Sony back podcast media Neon Hum's diverse training bootcamp 
.

Before This American Life, Berry was an editor and producer at Gimlet Media, where she ran and worked on several shows including The Nod (podcast), Undone (podcast), and StartUp (podcast). In 2014, she was a producer at WKAR Public Radio in Michigan

and later moved to St. Louis Public Radio as race and culture reporter where she covered the Ferguson protests

. 
She co-founded and hosted the St. Louis Public Radio podcast We Live Here
.

In 2015, Berry was a Fulbright recipient of an English Teaching Assistantship to Macau
 and a 2014 AIR New Voices Scholar.

Her work has been recognized by the Michigan Association of Broadcasters, the Society of Professional Journalists, the Radio Television Digital News Association and the Hearst Journalism Awards Program.

Education 
Berry attended Michigan State University and graduated in 2012 with a B.A in Journalism with an additional major in the Residential College of Arts and Humanities. Before Michigan State University, she attended Lansing Community College (2009 - 2010) where she was a four-year starter, and Captain of the Varsity Team  and Albion College (2008 - 2009) in Michigan.

Berry was born and raised in Michigan to Black father - Bobby Berry and a white mother - Arlean.

References

External links 
  This American Life

Year of birth missing (living people)
Living people
21st-century American journalists
African-American writers
American podcasters
American radio producers
This American Life people
21st-century American women
21st-century American people
21st-century African-American women
21st-century African-American people
Women radio producers